Emiko Queen is a superheroine appearing in American comic books published by DC Comics. The character was created by writer Jeff Lemire and artist Andrea Sorrentino and debuted in Green Arrow, Vol. 5 #18 (March 2013). She is the younger paternal half-sister and sidekick of Green Arrow. Emiko has been associated with the mantle of Green Arrow, but is more commonly known as the second Red Arrow.

Inspired by Thea Queen played by Willa Holland, an original character to The CW live-action Arrowverse series Arrow, Emiko Queen was later introduced in the series in season seven following the former character's departure. Portrayed by Sea Shimooka, it is the first screen adaptation of the character.

Publication history 
Emiko debuted in The New 52's Green Arrow, Vol. 5 #18 (March 2013), written by Jeff Lemire and designed by artist Andrea Sorrentino. The character was created as a parallel to Thea Queen, an original character to the Arrowverse and the younger maternal half-sister of Oliver Queen from The CW series Arrow.

While Emiko originally addresses herself as the new Green Arrow before joining her brother's crusade, it is not until later during DC Rebirth that, after her apparent betrayal, Emiko would return and take on her own codename as Red Arrow, one previously held by Roy Harper during his membership in the Justice League in the Pre-Flashpoint era.

Fictional character biography

The New 52 
Emiko is the paternal half-sister of Oliver Queen/Green Arrow who is the illegitimate daughter of his father Robert Queen and the assassin Shado. Kept secret from the Queen family by her mother, as an infant Emiko was kidnapped by Simon Lacroix/Komodo, Robert's former associate. He raised her as an assassin, believing him to be her father. Upon her debut, Emiko watches as Komodo kills Green Arrow's associate Jax Jackson, and later reports that their other hostage Naomi Singh had managed to locate where Oliver Queen currently is. She later meets Green Arrow when she decides to help protect her father. Later, after Green Arrow rescues Shado from Count Vertigo, she confirms to him that Emiko is her daughter with his father Robert.

Emiko then appears during the Outsiders War storyline where, upon hearing that Shado is accompanying Green Arrow, she asked Komodo if it was true that her mother is still alive and is upset for having been lied to, but he tricks her into thinking that Green Arrow and Shado are only coming to take her away from him. Later, after Robert Queen was injured during their pursuit of them, Emiko begins to realize the truth that she is actually his daughter, something which Shado confirms, to which an angry Emiko exacts her vengeance by killing Komodo. Upon rejecting his position to become the head of the Outsiders Arrow Clan, Oliver offers that he'll take Emiko away from all of this for a fresh start, which Shado agrees as it is her choice to make.

Emiko decides to follow her brother back to Seattle as she recognizes that, unlike the rest, her brother had never lied to her and when he is attacked by the Longbow Hunters, she introduces herself as the Green Arrow.

DC Rebirth 
Together with her older half-brother Oliver, she infiltrated the docks to rescue kidnapped children. Black Canary appeared to help them and Emiko revealed she was a fan of Black Canary. All three then went back to Oliver's and Emiko's apartment where Dinah stayed for the night. Later that day, Oliver and the assassin Shado, the mother of Emiko, had a fight in Oliver's apartment with Oliver getting the upper hand. Oliver ordered Emiko to get out of the apartment but she instead, to Oliver's surprise, fired an arrow into his back. Emiko told Shado she had been waiting a long time for her mother to arrive. Together they got onto a boat, took Oliver's body with them, and drove away from the bay of Seattle out on the ocean. When in the middle of nowhere, they threw Oliver's body over the rail, deep down into the ocean. They then traveled to the base built on water called the Inferno, where Shado's masters, the criminal organization called the Ninth Circle operated. After Oliver turned out to be alive, Emiko conducted a plan for the Ninth Circle to capture Dinah, to stop them from going after her mother who had fallen on bad terms with the organization after her failed assassination of Oliver. They lured Dinah to the Inferno where Emiko managed to capture her. When Emiko and Shado were supposed to kill Dinah she instead rescued her revealing that she had been a double agent all the time. Moments later she met Oliver, who had infiltrated the Inferno, and told him she had been trying to help him all the time. She had slipped a homing beacon into his pocket when she dumped him into the ocean, thus helping Henry Fyff locate Oliver. She had also anonymously contacted John Diggle and had secretly revealed the location of the Inferno to Oliver. Furious over her daughter's betrayal, Shado took Emiko hostage, taking her with her in a helicopter as the Inferno exploded. Emiko returned to Seattle, now going by the name Red Arrow, and saved Oliver, Black Canary, and the Seattle Police Department from Scott Notting and the Vice Squad. Later she becomes a member of the Teen Titans.

Powers and abilities
Under the tutelage of Simon Lacroix, Emiko became a skilled archer and a disciplined fighter. She has the power to be quite dangerous and potentially murderous.

In other media
Emiko Queen makes her screen adaptation debut in the seventh season of The CW's live-action television series Arrow, portrayed by Sea Shimooka. This version is an adult, and the daughter of Robert Queen and a woman of Japanese descent named Kazumi Adachi. Initially introduced as the new Green Arrow who protects Star City while Oliver Queen is in prison, she is eventually revealed as the leader of a terrorist organization known as the Ninth Circle, who recruited and trained her after she was abandoned by her father. She looks to destroy Oliver's legacy as payback. Her personal vendetta against Oliver exposes the Ninth Circle and when her plan to destroy Star City fails, the organization's council turns on her. During a fight with the Ninth Circle, Emiko is mortally wounded and finally makes amends with her half-brother before dying. In the eighth season following the events of Crisis on Infinite Earths, Oliver resurrects Emiko without her violent past during the formation of Earth-Prime, but is aware of her history and death prior to the Crisis. She appears in the series finale "Fadeout", meeting both Moira and Thea Queen at Oliver's funeral and being welcomed into the Queen family.

References 

DC Comics sidekicks
Comics characters introduced in 2013
DC Comics American superheroes
DC Comics female superheroes
Fictional archers
Fictional assassins in comics
Fictional female assassins
Green Arrow characters
DC Comics television characters
Vigilante characters in comics